Raffaele Manardi (10 May 1913 – 15 January 1975) was an Italian bobsledder who competed in the 1930s. He finished tenth in the four-man event at the 1936 Winter Olympics in Garmisch-Partenkirchen.

References

1936 bobsleigh four-man results
1936 Olympic Winter Games official report. - p. 415.
Raffaele Manardi's profile at Sports Reference.com

Olympic bobsledders of Italy
Bobsledders at the 1936 Winter Olympics
Italian male bobsledders
1913 births
1975 deaths